Bryantina is a monotypic genus of flies belonging to the family Muscidae. The only species is Bryantina javensis.

References

Muscidae
Monotypic Diptera genera